Za'gya Zangbo railway station is a station on the Chinese Qinghai–Tibet Railway, at an altitude of .

See also
 List of highest railway stations in the world
 Qingzang Railway
 List of stations on Qingzang railway

Railway stations in Tibet
Stations on the Qinghai–Tibet Railway